Ahmed Diab (born 15 July 1954) is an Egyptian fencer. He competed in the foil and épée events at the 1984 Summer Olympics.

References

External links
 

1954 births
Living people
Egyptian male épée fencers
Olympic fencers of Egypt
Fencers at the 1984 Summer Olympics
Egyptian male foil fencers
20th-century Egyptian people